Arnold Legg  was a bishop in the Church of South India, the inaugural Bishop of South Kerala.

Legg was a LMS missionary serving at South Travancore and Trivandrum.  He was consecrated our first bishop at St. George's Cathedral, Madras on 27 September 1947. In 1959, the diocese was split into South Kerala and Kanyakumari dioceses, with Legg continuing as bishop of South Kerala.

Notes

 

20th-century Anglican bishops in India
Indian bishops
Indian Christian religious leaders
Anglican bishops of South Kerala
Moderators of the Church of South India